Moffat is a former burgh and spa town in Dumfries and Galloway, Scotland.

Moffat or Moffatt may also refer to:

Places

United States
 Moffat, Colorado, a town
 Moffat County, Colorado
 Moffat Tunnel, a railroad tunnel in Colorado
 Moffatt Township, Michigan
 Moffat, Texas, an unincorporated community

Elsewhere
 Moffat Beach, Queensland, Australia
 Mount Moffat, Antarctica
 Moffat Hills, Scotland, a range of hills

People
 Moffat (surname), a list of people with the surname Moffat or Moffatt
 Moffat (given name), a list of people with the given name Moffat or Moffatt
 Clan Moffat, Scottish clan

Arts and entertainment
 The Moffatts, Canadian band
 The Moffats, a children's novel by Eleanor Estes
 Irene Moffat, a character in the 1987 American fantasy comedy movie Harry and the Hendersons
 Sarah Moffat, a fictional television character from Upstairs, Downstairs

Other uses
 Moffat (company), an appliance brand originally from Australia
 Moffat Communications, a regional cable TV company in Winnipeg, Canada
 Moffat Academy, a school in Moffat, Dumfries and Galloway, Scotland
 Moffat Library, Washingtonville, New York
 Moffat toffee, a confection made in Moffat, Scotland
 Moffat or Moffatt, later name of Boyne (1807 ship)
 5542 Moffatt, an asteroid

See also
 Moffat v Moffat, a 1984 New Zealand law case
 Moffat distribution, a probability distribution based upon the Lorentzian distribution
 Moffatt, New Translation, a 1926 translation of the Bible
 Moffatt oxidation, a chemical reaction
 Moffett (disambiguation)
 Moffitt (disambiguation)